Dancing with the Stars: All Stars may refer to:

 Dancing with the Stars (American season 15)
 Dancing with the Stars (Australian season 18)